Coatomer subunit beta is a protein that is encoded by the COPB2 gene in humans.

Function 

The Golgi coatomer complex (see MIM 601924) constitutes the coat of nonclathrin-coated vesicles and is essential for Golgi budding and vesicular trafficking. It consists of 7 protein subunits, including COPB2.[supplied by OMIM]

Interactions 

COPB2 has been shown to interact with:
 COPB1,
 PRKCE,  and
 RGS4.

References

External links

Further reading